This list covers television programs whose first letter (excluding "the") of the title is B.

B

BA

Baa Baa Black Sheep
Babar
Babar and the Adventures of Badou
Babes
Babestation
Babushka
Babylon 5
Baby Boom
Baby Daddy
Baby Looney Tunes
The Baby-Sitters Club
A Baby Story
Baby Talk
Bachelor Father
The Bachelor (Australia)
The Bachelor (US)
The Bachelor (UK)
The Bachelor Canada
The Bachelor New Zealand
Bachelor Pad
Bachelor in Paradise (Australia)
Bachelor in Paradise (US)
Bachelor in Paradise: After Paradise
The Bachelor Presents: Listen to Your Heart
The Bachelor Winter Games
The Bachelorette (Australia)
The Bachelorette (US)
The Bachelorette Canada
The Bachelorette India
Back at the Barnyard
Backstage
Backstrom
Back to the Floor (UK)
Back to the Future: The Animated Series
Back to You
Backyard Blitz
Backyard Science (Australia)
The Backyardigans
Bad Dog
Bad Education
The Bad Girl's Guide
Bad Girls
Bad Girls All-Star Battle
Bad Girls Club
Bad Girls Road Trip
Bad Ink
Bagdad Cafe
Baggage
Baggage Battles
Bagpuss
Bailando Kids (Argentina)
Bailando por un Sueño (Argentina)
Bake Off: The Professionals (UK)
Bakugan
Balamory
Ballbreakers
Baller Wives
Ballers
Bam's Unholy Union
Banacek
Banshee
The Banana Splits
Band of Brothers
The Barbara Stanwyck Show
Barbarian Chronicles
Barbie: Life in the Dreamhouse
Barefoot Contessa
Barefoot in the Park
Barely Famous
Baretta
Bargain Hunt (British)
Barnaby Jones
Barney & Friends
Barney Miller
The Baron
Bar Rescue
Barry
Barry'd Treasure
Barter Kings
Baseball Tonight
Basil Brush
Basketball Wives
Basketball Wives LA
Baskets
Bat Masterson
Bates Motel
Batfink
Bath Crashers
Batman
Batman and the Super 7
Batman: The Animated Series
Batman Beyond
Batman: The Brave and the Bold
The New Batman/Superman Adventures
The Batman
Battery Park
Battle B-Daman
Battle of the Blades (Canada) 
BattleBots
Battle Creek
Battle Dome
Battle of the Gridiron Stars
Battle of the Network Reality Stars
Battle of the Network Stars
Battlestar Galactica (1978)
Battlestar Galactica (2004)
Batwoman
Bay City Blues
Bayly
Baywatch
Baywatch Nights
Barbie Dreamtopia

BB
BBC Breakfast (UK)
BBQ Blitz
BBQ with Bobby Flay

BE

The Beachcombers
Beadle's About
Beakman's World
Beany and Cecil
Bear in the Big Blue House
Bear Grylls: Mission Survive
Bearcats!
BeastMaster
The Beat
Beat Bobby Flay
Beat Bugs
Beat The Chef
Beat the Clock
Beat Shazam
Beating Heart
The Beautiful Life: TBL
Beauty and the Beast (Australian talk show)
Beauty and the Beast (1987)
Beauty & the Beast (2012)
Beauty and the Geek
Beauty School Cop Outs (UK)
Beavis and Butt-Head
Le Bébête Show
Becker
Becoming Us
Be Cool, Scooby-Doo!
The Bedford Diaries
Bedtime Stories (UK)
Beetleborgs
Beetlejuice
Beforeigners
Behind the Bash
Behind Closed Doors
Behind the Mask
Behind the Music
Being Erica
Being Human (2009)
Being Human (2011)
Being Ian
Belief
Bella and the Bulldogs
Belle and Sebastian (French, 1965)
Belle and Sebastian (French, 2017)
Belle and Sebastian (Japanese)
Below Deck
Below Deck Mediterranean
Below Deck Sailing Yacht
Bem-Vindos a Beirais
Ben 10 (2005)
Ben 10: Alien Force
Ben 10: Ultimate Alien
Ben 10: Omniverse
Ben 10 (2016)
Ben Casey
Benidorm
Ben & Holly's Little Kingdom
Ben and Kate
The Benny Hill Show
The Ben Stiller Show
Benson
The Berenstain Bears (1985)
The Berenstain Bears (2003)
Bergerac
Bernard
The Bernie Mac Show
Bert the Conqueror
Bertha (British)
Besame Tonto (Venezuela-Peru)
Best Ed (Canada)
Best Ever Trivia Show
Best Friends Whenever
Best Week Ever
The Best Years
Bethenny
Bethenny Ever After
Better
Better Call Saul
Better Homes and Gardens (Australia)
Better Off Ted
The Better Sex
Better Things
Better with You
Bettina S.
Betty White's Off Their Rockers
Between the Lions
Beverly's Full House
The Beverly Hillbillies
Beverly Hills, 90210
Beverly Hills Teens
Bewitched
Beyblade
Beyblade: Metal Fusion 
Beyond (Canada)
Beyond (Singapore)
Beyond (US)
Beyond the Tank

BH

BH90210

BI

Bienvenidos (Venezuela)
Big Arvo
Big Bad Beetleborgs
The Big Bang Theory
Big Blue
The Big Brain Theory
The Big Breakfast (UK)
Big Brother
Big Brother (Australia)
Big Brother Brasil
Big Brother Canada
Big Brother (UK)
Big Brother (US)
Big Brother: After Dark
Big Brother: Over the Top
Big City Greens
The Big Comfy Couch
Big Daddy's House
The Big Family Cooking Showdown (UK)
Big Fan
Big Fat Gypsy Weddings (UK)
The Big Gig
Big Hero 6: The Series
The Big House
Big Kids
Big Little Lies
Big Love
Big Man (South Korea)
Big Mouth
Big Nate
The Big Picture
Big Shot
The Big Story (1949)
The Big Story (2000)
Big Town
Big Time in Hollywood, FL
Big Time Rush
The Big Valley
Big Wolf on Campus
Bigfoot and Wildboy
The Biggest Loser
Bill and Ben
The Bill
Bill & Ted's Excellent Adventures (1990)
Bill & Ted's Excellent Adventures (1992)
Bill Nye Saves the World
Bill Nye the Science Guy
Billion Dollar Buyer
Billions
Billy (with Steve Guttenberg, 1979)
Billy (with Billy Connolly, 1992)
Billy Dilley's Super-Duper Subterranean Summer
Billy the Cat
Bindi the Jungle Girl (Australia)
Bindi's Bootcamp (Australia)
Biography
Biography: WWE Legends
Bionic Six
Bionic Woman
The Bionic Woman
Birds of a Feather
Birds of Prey
Birdz
Bizaardvark

BJ

B. J. and the Bear

BL

Black and Blue (UK)
Blackadder
Blackboard Wars
Black-ish
Black Lightning
The Blacklist
The Blacklist: Redemption
Blackpool
Black Bird
Black Books
Black Butler
The Black Donnellys
Black Dynamite
Black Ink Crew
Black Ink Crew: Chicago
Black Mirror (UK)
Black Panther
Blade
Blade: The Series
Blake's 7
Blandings
Blansky's Beauties
Blaster's Universe
Blaze and the Monster Machines
Blazing Dragons
Bleach
Bless the Harts
Bless This House (UK)
Bless This House (US)
Bless This Mess
Blind Date
Blindspot
Blood (South Korea)
Bloodivores (China-Japan, 2016)
Bloodline
Blood Drive
Blood, Sweat & Heels
Blood Ties
The Block
Blockbusters
Blonde Charity Mafia
Blood & Oil
Blood & Treasure
Blossom
Blow Out
Blue Bloods
Blue Heelers
Blue Mountain State
Blue Peter
Blue Thunder
Blue's Clues
Bluey (1976) (Australia) 
Bluey (2018) (Australia)

BO

Bo on the Go! (Canada)
Boardwalk Empire
Bob & Carol & Ted & Alice
Bob and Margaret
Bobb'e Says
The Bobby Vinton Show (Canada)
The Bob Cummings Show
Bob Hope Presents the Chrysler Theatre
The Bob Newhart Show
Bobobo-bo Bo-bobo
Bob Patterson
Bob the Builder
Bob Vila
Bob Vila's Home Again
Bob's Burgers
Bobby's World
Body Language
BodyShaping
BodyShock
Boj
BoJack Horseman
The Bold and the Beautiful
The Bold Ones
The Bold Type
Bonanza
Bones
Boney (Australia)
Boohbah (UK)
The Book of Boba Fett
The Book of Pooh
The Book Quiz
Booker
Bonkers
Bookmice
Boon
The Boondocks
Boonie Bears (China)
Boot Camp
Bored to Death
Borgia
The Borgias (1981)
The Borgias (2011)
Born Free
Boruto: Naruto Next Generations (2017, Japan)
The Boss Baby: Back in Business
Boston Common
Boston EMS
Boston Legal
Boston Med
Boston Public
Botched
Botched by Nature
The Bots Master
Bottersnikes and Gumbles
Bourbon Street Beat
Bowling For Dollars
The Box (Australian TV series)
The Box (Irish TV series)
The Box (game show)
Boy Band
 Boy Girl Dog Cat Mouse Cheese
Boy Meets World
Boyster
The Bozo Show

BR

Bracken's World
Brat Camp
Braceface
The Brady Brides
The Brady Bunch
The Brady Bunch Hour
The Bradys
Brady's Beasts
The Brain (China)
BrainDead
Brain Game (1972)
Brain Game (1997)
Braingames (1983)
Brain Games (2011)
BrainSurge
The Brak Show
Branded
Brandi & Jarrod: Married to the Job
Brandy & Mr. Whiskers
Brass Eye
Bratz
The Brave
Bravestarr
Braxton Family Values
Bread
Break the Bank (1948)
Break the Bank (1976)
Break the Bank (1985)
Break with the Boss (UK)
Breaker High (Canada)
Breakfast News
Breaking Amish
Breaking Amish: Brave New World
Breaking Away
Breaking Bad
Breaking Bonaduce
Breakout Kings
The Brian Keith Show
Brickleberry
Bridalplasty
Bridezillas
Bridgerton
Bridget Loves Bernie
Bringing Up Bates
Bringing Up Buddy
Bring the Funny
Bring It!
The Brink
Brimstone
Britain's Got Talent
Britain's Missing Top Model
Britain's Next Top Model
Britney and Kevin: Chaotic
The Brittas Empire
Broadchurch (UK)
Broad City
Broke Ass Game Show
Broken Arrow
Bromance
Bromwell High
Bronco
Brooke Knows Best
Brooklyn Nine-Nine
Brooklyn South
Brotherly Love
The Brothers (1972) (UK)
Brothers & Sisters (1979)
Brothers & Sisters (2006)
Bruno the Kid

BU

Bubble Guppies
The Buccaneers
Buck Rogers
Buck Rogers in the 25th Century
Bucket & Skinner's Epic Adventures
Buddy Deane Show
Buffy the Vampire Slayer
Bug Juice: My Adventures at Camp
The Bugaloos
Bugs Bunny Builders
The Bugs Bunny Show
Bug Juice
Bull (2000)
Bull (2015)
Bull (2016)
Bull Session
Bullseye (1980) (U.S.)
Bullseye (1981) (U.K.)
Bullseye (2015) (U.S.)
Bumper Stumpers
Bumpety Boo
Bump in the Night
Bunheads
Bunk'd
Bunnytown
Bunsen Is a Beast
Burke's Law (1963)
Burke's Law (1994)
Burn Notice
Business Tonight
Bustin' Loose
Busting Loose
Busy Tonight
Busytown Mysteries
The Busy World of Richard Scarry
Butterbean's Café
Buzz Lightyear of Star Command
The Buzz on Maggie

BY

Byker Grove

Previous:  List of television programs: A    Next:  List of television programs: C